The Lewis and Clark Bridge is a bridge that crosses the Ohio River northeast of downtown Louisville, Kentucky and is part of a ring road around the Louisville metropolitan area, connecting two previously disjointed segments of Interstate 265. It was known as the East End Bridge for 30 years since its conception and while under construction, and renamed by Indiana officials on the day of its opening, December 18, 2016.  The bridge provides for walking and bicycling.  For motor vehicles, tolling began on December 30, 2016.

History 

The design for what was then known as the East End Bridge is the result of the $22.1 million, four-year Ohio River Bridges Study, which found that solving the region's traffic congestion would require the construction of two new bridges across the Ohio River and reconstruction of the Kennedy Interchange in downtown Louisville.

Limited land acquisition began in 2004. Construction costs totaled $242 million at the end of January 2017.

On June 4, 2019, the two disjointed sections of I-265 were finally connected under AASHTO approval, with the Indiana State Road 265 designation decommissioned and replaced by I-265. However, the Kentucky Route 841 designation mostly concurrent with I-265 in Kentucky has remained.

Comparison with Clark Memorial Bridge 
The Clark Memorial Bridge crosses the Ohio River in downtown Louisville, and like the upstream Lewis and Clark Bridge, connects Jefferson County, Kentucky to Clark County, Indiana.  The Clark Memorial Bridge is named for George Rogers Clark, while the Clark of the Lewis and Clark Expedition is George's brother William Clark. Both bridges include dedicated pedestrian facilities.

See also 

 List of crossings of the Ohio River

References

External links
 East End Crossing

Transportation in Louisville, Kentucky
Toll bridges in Indiana
Toll bridges in Kentucky
Bridges over the Ohio River
2016 establishments in Indiana
2016 establishments in Kentucky
Bridges completed in 2016
Cable-stayed bridges in the United States
Road bridges in Indiana
Road bridges in Kentucky
Bridges in Clark County, Indiana
Buildings and structures in Louisville, Kentucky